Curtis G. Sonney (born July 31, 1957) is an American politician. A Republican, he served as a member of the Pennsylvania House of Representatives for the 4th District from 2005 through 2022.

Early life
Sonney was born on July 31, 1957 in Erie, Pennsylvania and graduated from Harbor Creek High School in 1975. During high school, he attended classes at Erie County Vo-Tech. Sonney later took courses at Penn State Behrend in Erie.

Prior to being elected, Sonney was a self-employed contractor.  He later took a job with American Sterilizer Co, now STERIS Corporation.  Sonney is a member of United Auto Workers Local 832.

Political
Sonney was first elected in 2004 when he defeated incumbent Tom Scrimenti by 180 votes. In 2006, he ran unopposed for re-election.

Sonney served as the House Education Committee Chairman and also served on the Professional Licensure committee.

References

External links
Representative Curt Sonney official web site
PA House profile

1951 births
Living people
Republican Party members of the Pennsylvania House of Representatives
Pennsylvania State University alumni
Politicians from Erie, Pennsylvania
21st-century American politicians